Qincheng may refer to:

Qincheng Village, village in Xingshou, Changping District, Beijing, China
Qincheng Prison, maximum-security prison in Qincheng Village, Xingshou, Changping District, Beijing, China
Qincheng, Nanfeng County, town in Jiangxi, China

See also
Qingcheng (disambiguation)